Ivy Substation (also known as the Ivy Park Substation or Culver Substation) is a 99-seat theatre in Culver City, California which formerly housed power equipment for the nearby electric railways and Ivy station. It was listed on the National Register of Historic Places in 1981.

History
A single story, rectangular shaped building in the Mission Revival style, it was built in 1907 as a traction substation by the Los Angeles Pacific Railway which subsequently became part of the Pacific Electric railway in 1911. 

Made of brick covered in stucco, the large interior once held old style rotary mechanical rectifiers to convert very high voltage alternating current (AC) to 600 volt direct current (DC) to operate run cars for serve nearby streetcar and interurban lines: the PE's Venice Short Line, Redondo Beach via Playa del Rey Line, and Santa Monica Air Line. 

It remained in service until 1953. The old equipment was removed and the building was purchased by the City of Los Angeles, but sat vacant for many years. In the early 1990s, the Culver City Redevelopment Agency and the City of Los Angeles renovated the building to use as a community theater by The Actors' Gang.

The building was listed in the National Register of Historic Places because of its association with the transportation history of Los Angeles as well as for its architecture.

See also
 Culver City station, formerly Ivy station.
Pacific Electric Railway Company Substation No. 8
Pacific Electric Sub-Station No. 14
List of Pacific Electric Railway lines

References

External links
 The Actors Gang Theatre

Theatres in Los Angeles County, California
Pacific Electric infrastructure
History of Los Angeles County, California
Railway buildings and structures on the National Register of Historic Places
Los Angeles Historic-Cultural Monuments
Buildings and structures in Culver City, California
Railway buildings and structures on the National Register of Historic Places in California
Industrial buildings and structures on the National Register of Historic Places in California
Transportation buildings and structures in Los Angeles County, California
1907 establishments in California
Industrial buildings completed in 1907
Theatres completed in 1992